Tula Shikvin Changalach Dhada is an Indian Marathi language television drama series which is airing on Zee Marathi. It starred Hrishikesh Shelar, Kavita Lad and Shivani Rangole in lead roles. It is produced by Sharmishtha Raut and Tejas Desai under the banner of Ericon Telefilms. The series premiered from 13 March 2023 which is directed by Chandrakant Gaikwad.

Plot 
Having contrasting mindsets, sparks fly when Akshara, a teacher who values education encounters Bhuvaneshwari, a rich woman for whom money means everything.

Cast

Main 
 Shivani Rangole as Akshara Aamonkar
 Hrishikesh Shelar as Adhipati Suryavanshi
 Kavita Lad as Bhuvaneshwari Suryavanshi

Recurring 
 Ruplaxmi Shinde
 Devendra Deo
 Vijay Gokhale
 Dipti Sonawane
 Ruta Kale

References

External links 
 Tula Shikvin Changalach Dhada at ZEE5
 
Marathi-language television shows
2023 Indian television series debuts
Zee Marathi original programming